Huskies of Honor is a recognition program sponsored by the University of Connecticut (UConn). Similar to a hall of fame, it honors the most significant figures in the history of the UConn Huskies—the university's athletic teams—especially the men's and women's basketball teams.  The inaugural honorees, inducted in two separate ceremonies during the 2006–07 season, included thirteen men's basketball players, ten women's basketball players, and four head coaches, of whom two coaches—Jim Calhoun and Geno Auriemma—and two players—Ray Allen and Rebecca Lobo—are also enshrined in the Naismith Memorial Basketball Hall of Fame. Since that time, an additional nine women's basketball players, seven men's basketball players, five national championship teams, one women's basketball assistant coach, and one athletic director have been honored.

Men's basketball has been played at the University of Connecticut since 1901, when the school was known as Connecticut Agricultural College.  The Huskies first achieved success under Coach Hugh Greer, who over a sixteen-year period led the team to twelve Yankee Conference championships, seven National Collegiate Athletics Association (NCAA) Tournament berths, and one National Invitation Tournament appearance before dying suddenly during the 1962–63 college basketball season.  It was not until Calhoun took over the university's basketball program in 1985, however, that UConn grew from a regional basketball power to a nationally prominent one.  Under Calhoun, UConn won three national championships (1999, 2004, 2011), seven Big East tournaments, and ten Big East regular season titles, while placing twenty-six former players into the National Basketball Association (NBA).  Following Calhoun's retirement, new head coach Kevin Ollie would lead UConn to a fourth national championship win in 2014.

Women's basketball was not a major sport at UConn until the arrival of Auriemma in 1985.  Under his guidance UConn has enjoyed unprecedented success, winning 11 national titles, including six at the end of undefeated seasons and four consecutive championships from 2013–16.  The Huskies also have the two longest winning streaks in NCAA Division I basketball history, at 111 games from 2014–17 and 90 games from 2008–10.  Connecticut's rivalry with women's basketball power Tennessee has been one of the most celebrated in the sport.  Twenty-six former UConn women's basketball players have gone on to play in the Women's National Basketball Association (WNBA), and five—Sue Bird in 2002, Diana Taurasi in 2004, Tina Charles in 2010, Maya Moore in 2011, and Breanna Stewart in 2016—have been selected first overall in the WNBA Draft.  Stewart, Moriah Jefferson, and Morgan Tuck were the first three picks in the 2016 draft; this marked the first time three players from the same college were selected 1-2-3 in the draft of any major sport.

Placards honoring the members of the Huskies of Honor are hung at the Harry A. Gampel Pavilion, the on-campus home court of UConn basketball.  Additional information about each of the honorees is displayed on the concourse between the upper and lower stands.

Honorees

Men's basketball

Women's basketball

Administrators

Future honorees 
UConn officials have indicated that men's basketball alumnus Ben Gordon will be added to the Huskies of Honor in the near future.  The university is working with Gordon to determine when he will be able to attend an induction ceremony at a men's basketball game at Gampel Pavilion.

The display

Notes

References

External links

Huskies of Honor UConn's official website

Halls of fame in Connecticut
College sports halls of fame in the United States
Awards established in 2006
Lists of college men's basketball players in the United States
Lists of college women's basketball players in the United States
UConn Huskies basketball